Hassan Zaher Al-Maghni (born 7 January 1985), commonly known as Hassan Zaher, is an Omani footballer who plays for Al-Nasr S.C.S.C.

Club career statistics

International career
Hassan was selected for the national team for the first time in 2006. He has made appearances in the 2007 AFC Asian Cup qualification.

References

External links

Hassan Zaher Al Maghni at Goal.com

1985 births
Living people
Omani footballers
Oman international footballers
Omani expatriate footballers
Association football forwards
Al-Nasr SC (Salalah) players
Salalah SC players
Expatriate footballers in Bahrain
Omani expatriate sportspeople in Bahrain
Footballers at the 2006 Asian Games
Asian Games competitors for Oman
People from Muscat, Oman